Bright Lake may refer to:
 Bright Lake (Iławskie Lakeland), a lake in Iławskie Lakeland, Poland
 Bright Lake (Mazurskie Lakeland), a lake in Mazurskie Lakeland, Poland
 Bright Lake (Minnesota), a lake in Tenhassen Township, Martin County, Minnesota, USA